Harvey Price may refer to:

Harvey L. Price, scouter (Boy Scouts of America)
Harvey Price (songwriter), on the Thelma Houston album Sunshower
Harvey Price, son of Katie Price